Michael Knaus is an Austrian para-alpine skier and director for the Paralympic division of ÖSV, the Austrian Skiing Federation. He represented Austria at the 1984 Winter Paralympics and he competed in three events in alpine skiing.

He won the silver medal at the Men's Slalom LW6/8 event. He also competed in the Men's Giant Slalom LW6/8 and Men's Downhill LW6/8 events but did not win a medal.

See also 
 List of Paralympic medalists in alpine skiing

References 

Living people
Year of birth missing (living people)
Place of birth missing (living people)
Paralympic alpine skiers of Austria
Alpine skiers at the 1984 Winter Paralympics
Medalists at the 1984 Winter Paralympics
Paralympic silver medalists for Austria
Paralympic medalists in alpine skiing
20th-century Austrian people